Milstead is a village in Kent, England. 

It may also refer to:

People
Century Milstead (1901–1963), American football player
Charlie Milstead (1937-2022), American football player
Divine (performer) (born Harris Glenn Milstead, 1945–1988), American actor, singer and drag queen
George Milstead (1903–1977), American baseball pitcher
Rod Milstead (born 1969), American football player
Violet Milstead (1919–2014), Canadian aviator and bush pilot

Places
Milstead, Alabama, United States
Milstead, Georgia, United States